Al Madinah Region Development Authority (MMDA) is a Saudi Arabian governmental agency that is chaired by Prince Faisal bin Salman bin Abdulaziz. MMDA is responsible for developing a comprehensive plan for Al Madinah Region, to prepare the city of Medina for the visitors and to meet the expectations of its residents and visitors.

Al Madinah Al Munawwarah Public Transportation Program (MPTP) 
MMDA concluded an agreement to implement a large-scale transportation infrastructure project in the city of Medinah for the total cost of $100 million. The project includes constructing new roads network as well as building infrastructure for buses and trains.

References 

Government agencies of Saudi Arabia